Éric Brian is a historian of science and a sociologist. He studies the uncertainty and regularity of social phenomena, and in particular, how scientists have caught and conceived them as objects of mathematics or social and economic sciences.

He is currently senior professor at EHESS (École des hautes études en sciences sociales, Paris, France). Since 1995, he has been the editor of the Revue de synthèse today published at  Brill Publishers (Paris). Between 1997 and 2018, he taught at the University of Vienna (Austria).

External links
 Éric Brian's scientific information blog.
 Website of the Revue de synthèse.

Some publications
  Maurice Fréchet et Maurice Halbwachs Le Calcul des probabilités à la portée de tous], réédition avec Laurent Mazliak et Hugo Lavenant. Strasbourg, Presses universitaires de Strasbourg, 2019.
 Émile Durkheim et Marcel Mauss,  De quelques formes primitives de classification (1903)]. Paris, Presses universitaires de France, 2017 (réédition).
  (dir.) « Sociologie générale, éléments nouveaux », Revue de synthèse, 133 (1), 2012.
  (co-dir.) « Social Memory and Hyper Modernity », International Social Science Journal (Unesco), 62 (203-204), 2011.
  Comment tremble la main invisible. Incertitude et marchés]. Paris, Springer Verlag, 2009.
  Critique de la valeur fondamentale], codirigé avec Christian Walter. Paris, Springer Verlag, 2007.
  Le Sexisme de la première heure. Hasard et sociologie], avec Marie Jaisson. Paris, Raisons d'agir, 2007.
  The Descent of Human Sex Ratio at Birth. A Dialogue between Mathematics, Biology and Sociology, avec Marie Jaisson. Dordrecht, Springer Verlag, 2007.
 Maurice Halbwachs et coll., Le Point de vue du nombre (1936), codirigée avec Marie Jaisson. Paris, éditions de l'Ined, 2005.
 Condorcet, Tableau historique de l'esprit humain. Projets, Esquisse, Fragments et Notes (1772-1794)], avec le groupe Condorcet sous la direction de Jean-Pierre Schandeler et Pierre Crépel. Paris, éditions de l'Ined, 2004.
 Règlement, usages et science dans la France de l'Absolutisme, codirigé avec Christiane Demeulenaere-Douyère. Paris, éditions Technique & Documentation, 2002.
 Staatsvermessungen. Condorcet, Laplace, Turgot und das Denken der Verwaltung. Wien, Springer Verlag, 2001.
 Histoire et mémoire de l'Académie des sciences. Guide de recherches, codirigé avec Christiane Demeulenaere-Douyère. Paris, éditions Technique & Documentation, 1996.
  (co-dir.) Henri Berr et la culture du XXe s. Histoire, science et philosophie, Revue de synthèse, 117 (1-2), 1996.
 La Mesure de l'État. Administrateurs et géomètres au XVIIIe siècle. Paris, Albin Michel, 1994.

French sociologists
21st-century French historians
Living people
French male non-fiction writers
Year of birth missing (living people)